Jared Wade (born August 27, 1988 in Savannah, Georgia) is an American country music singer-songwriter. Wade was raised in Pooler, outside Savannah, and attended Georgia Southern University with classmate Luke Bryan. He received a Bachelor of Science in Manufacturing and held a management position at United Parcel Service until he learned to play guitar for the first time in 2006.

Jared landed the opening act slot for the Luke Bryan 'Farm Tour', both in 2010 and 2011, which opened opportunities for more shows with artists such as Wade Bowen, Confederate Railroad, Joe Diffie, Trent Tomlinson, John Anderson, Craig Campbell and Blackhawk.

On February 2, 2013 Wade released his debut EP Drunk On Sunshine which led to him to winning the Georgia Music Awards 2013 Country Male Vocalist of the Year.

In April 2014 Wade landed on the cover of Pooler Magazine and was again nominated for both Georgia Music Awards 2014 Male Vocalist of the Year and 2014 Country Male Vocalist of the Year.

Discography

Albums

References

External links 
  

1981 births
Living people
21st-century American male singers
21st-century American singers
American country guitarists
American country singer-songwriters
American male guitarists
American male singer-songwriters
Country musicians from Georgia (U.S. state)
Guitarists from Georgia (U.S. state)
Musicians from Savannah, Georgia
Singer-songwriters from Georgia (U.S. state)